Nicholas R. Nickson (born December 21, 1953) is an American sportscaster who currently serves as the radio play-by-play announcer for the Los Angeles Kings of the National Hockey League.

Biography

Early career
A native of Rochester, New York, Nickson attended Ithaca College, where he served as the Sports Director and play-by-play announcer for the school's radio station, WICB. His professional broadcasting career began in 1975 with the Rochester Americans. From 1977–81 he called games for the New Haven Nighthawks.

Kings broadcasting career
Nickson joined the Kings in 1981, calling games on TV and radio with Bob Miller. When the TV and radio broadcasts were separated in 1990, Nickson became the Kings radio play-by-play announcer. He has called all three of the Kings' appearances in the Stanley Cup Finals. 

As such, he was the voice Kings fans heard on the radio when they won their first-ever Stanley Cup. At the end of that game, Nickson told the story of the franchise up to that point when he bellowed:

Two years later, Nickson called Alec Martinez' goal in double overtime to give the Kings their second Cup.

Nickson later recalled that he and Miller had had time to pace themselves for their Cup-winning calls in 2012, as the Kings had put the game out of reach by scoring three unanswered goals on a five-minute power play in the first period. They didn't have that luxury in 2014.

In June 2015, the Hockey Hall of Fame announced that Nickson would be the 2015 recipient of the Foster Hewitt Memorial Award, officially being so honored on November 9, 2015.  He becomes the third Kings broadcaster to be inducted into the Hall of Fame, following Jiggs McDonald (1990) and Bob Miller (2000).

From 1983–89, Nickson served as a public address announcer for the Los Angeles Dodgers.

References

1953 births
Living people
American Hockey League broadcasters
Foster Hewitt Memorial Award winners
Ithaca College alumni
Major League Baseball public address announcers
Los Angeles Dodgers personnel
Los Angeles Kings announcers
National Hockey League broadcasters
Sportspeople from Rochester, New York
People from Santa Clarita, California
Sportspeople from Brooklyn